Omri Ferradura Breda, commonly known as Mestre Ferradura (born January 22, 1976), is a Mestre de Capoeira, pedagogue, president of the Brazilian Institute of Capoeira Education, and director of the Brincadeira de Angola project.

Biography 
Mestre Ferradura started practicing Capoeira in 1991, at Rio de Janeiro, at Mestre Marrom's Capoeira Angola. He started teaching Capoeira in 1993. Mestre Ferradura received his graduation by the Capoeira Master Henrique Anastacio de Jesus, the Mestre Marrom, in 2010. He graduated in pedagogy from the Federal University of the State of Rio de Janeiro, and specialized in Early Childhood Education. He is the founder and coordinator of Brincadeira de Angola Project, which has the purpose of the playful teaching of capoeira applied to early childhood education. The Brazilian Institute of Capoeira Education, project which he's president, he helps teachers to understand the concepts of Capoeira Education.

Contributions to the Capoeira Education field 
Mestre Ferradura possesses broad projection while defending the Brincadeira de Angola method, which is a pedagic-philosophic based on the educational potential, applying Capoeira as a transformative pedagogic practice in autonomous subjects formation, and deconstruction of racism through the valorization of the African roots. The basis of the methology is the ancestral knowledge of Capoeira, passed on from master to disciple in a traditional way. By balancing these popular and academic knowledge, the Brincadeira de Angola method suggest a Capoeira Pedagogy. Another contribution by Mestre Ferradura to the Capoeira community was the production of "Movimento Novo" (New Movement), along with Mestre Itapuã Beira-Mar, which brought discussions around the resulting violence from the contact of Capoeirists from different schools and proposes a pacific interaction to the new generations.

Research and academic production 
In the past decade, Mestre Ferradura has acted in the formation of teacher and promoting his pedagogic methodology in Brazil and Europe. His influences include Paulo Freire, Muniz Sodré, Marshall Rosemberg, Emília Viotti da Costa, Elisa Larkin Nascimento, Thomas E. Skidmore, Nestor Capoeira, Michel Foucalt, A.S. Neil, Terry Orlick, and Peter Slade. In his academic outreach, Mestre Ferradura travels and joins a number of formation programs and training of teachers and mestres in Brazilian and international Universities. Among the institutions which his courses and symposia have been ministrated, are included UFRR, UFBA, USP, and Museu da República.

His most notable articles are:

 Capoeira as a transformative educational practive  (2010)
 Capoeira as pedagogic practice in early childhood education  (2015)
 Capoeira as a libertarian education for the formation of autonomous subjects - the teaching practices in Rio de Janeiro's Rodas de Rua (2019)
 Brazilian racial ideology: the subjacent racism in comics magazines (2015)

His works are academic references in authors of varied fields of pedagogy and studies in the African matrix, influencing and being cited in a series of monographies in Brasil.

Social action 

Mestre Ferradura's participations in social action includes occasional participation in activities of the Third Sector to regular governamental projects, such as:

 At the Benjamin Constant Institute, with a project of educating Capoeira to blind children
 At DEGASE, with institutionalized teenagers serving socio-educational measures
 The Capoeira de Rua, with homeless people
 The Brazilian Capoeira-Education Institute for the Peace, in partnership with Gingando Pela Paz, UNESCO, and Viva Rio

Artistic contributions 
In the artistic fields, Mestre Ferradura has worked in a variety of direction of Capoeira, like:

 Intrépida Trupe, in the Kronos show, having participated in the front commission of Mocidade Independente de Padre Miguel, which won the Tamborim de Ouro Award in 1999.
 With Paola Barreto Leblanc, when signed the direction of Capoeira and writing the script of the "Maré Capoeira" movie.
 With João Falcão, director of "Ópera do Malandro", when he did body conditioning of the troupe at Theatro Municipal do Rio de Janeiro.

External links 
 Portal da Capoeira
 Instituto Brasileiro de Capoeira-Educação
 Projeto Brincadeira de Angola
 Capoeira Rio de Janeiro

References 

Capoeira mestres
Brazilian capoeira practitioners
1976 births
Living people